Fairy Bower may refer to:

Places
Fairy Bower, Queensland, a suburb of Rockhampton, Queensland, Australia
Fairy Bower Beach, beach in Manly, Sydney, New South Wales, Australia